The Sony FE 24-105mm F4 G OSS is a constant maximum aperture full-frame (FE) zoom lens for the Sony E-mount, announced by Sony on October 25, 2017.

Given its unusually high 1:3 (0.32x) image reproduction ratio, the 24-105mm lens can be considered a pseudo-macro lens. Though designed for Sony's full frame E-mount cameras, the lens can be used on Sony's APS-C E-mount camera bodies, with an equivalent full-frame field-of-view of 36–157.5mm.

Build quality
The lens showcases a matte-black weather resistant plastic exterior with a rubber focus and zoom ring. There is also a programmable external focus-hold button and an Autofocus-Manual focus switch. The barrel of the lens telescopes outward from the main lens body as it's zoomed in from 24mm to 105mm.

See also
List of Sony E-mount lenses

References

Camera lenses introduced in 2017
24-70